Jamie Francis Jervis (born 5 August 1980) is a former English cricketer. Jervis was a left-handed batsman who bowled right-arm off break. He was born in Stoke-on-Trent, Staffordshire.

Jervis made his debut for Staffordshire in the 1999 MCCA Knockout Trophy against the Leicestershire Cricket Board. Jervis played Minor counties cricket for Staffordshire from 1999 to 2001, which included 14 Minor Counties Championship matches and 5 MCCA Knockout Trophy matches. In 2001, he made his only List A appearance against the Worcestershire Cricket Board in the Cheltenham & Gloucester Trophy.  In this match, he scored 19 runs before being dismissed by Jonathan Wright.

His brother, Richie, also played Minor counties and List A cricket for Staffordshire.

References

External links
Jamie Jervis at ESPNcricinfo
Jamie Jervis at CricketArchive

1980 births
Living people
Cricketers from Stoke-on-Trent
English cricketers
Staffordshire cricketers